Series 17 of British television drama The Bill consisted of 92 episodes, broadcast between 5 January and 21 December 2001. As well as 85 regular episodes, the series also included a spinoff Beech is Back, following a special 90-minute episode in Australia. The story follows ex-Sun Hill officer Claire Stanton, now a DI, as she goes to Australia to try and extradite ex-DS Don Beech for the murder of his colleague John Boulton. The spinoff that follows concludes the Beech storyline, which began in Series 16. Although the idea of making the series into a serial drama did not fully take effect until April 2002, many of the stories in the latter half of the year were multi-part stories, some containing up to six episodes, such as the "Night Games" saga. The two-part episode "Lifelines" is the last two-parter to feature in the series until the return of episode titles in 2007. On 14 August 2013, The Bill Series 17 Part 1 & 2 and The Bill Series 17 Part 3 & 4 DVD sets were released (in Australia). The series saw an exit for Sergeant Bob Cryer, with actor Eric Richard controversially axed after 17 years with the show. His exit storyline saw him accidentally shot by PC Dale Smith, who transferred to SO19 as part of his exit storyline, however he would return two years later; Cryer would also return for a series of guest roles between 2002 and 2004. Former Brookside actor Paul Usher also joined the show on a permanent basis, playing PC Des Taviner, who would go on to be one of the show's most famous characters.

Producers used several plots in the series to focus on the mass of new characters introduced in series 16; DS Debbie McAllister and DC Paul Riley went head to head as McAllister fell for an informant who gave info against Riley's brother, and the eventual death of McAllister's informant led to a storyline that dominated the early proceedings of the series. DS Vik Singh also took centre stage in an undercover storyline, while DC Kate Spears became a key character in the autumn; after an affair with new station commander Tom Chandler, a storyline which resumed in series 18, she was subject to an attempted rape by a fellow police officer. Chandler also had a series of notable moments including a corruption allegation and his unsuccessful quest to succeed Guy Mannion as Borough Commander, as well as coming under fire from DC Mickey Webb after the death of a friend of Webb's during the four-part Britanniamania storyline.

Cast changes

Arrivals
 Sgt Craig Gilmore (Episode 26-)
 PC Des Taviner (Episode 33-)
 SC Terry Knowles

Departures
 Sgt. Bob Cryer - Retires after being accidentally shot by PC Smith
 PC Dale Smith - Transfers to S019 (temporary departure)
 PC Vicky Hagen - Transfers to Essex Police
 Chief Superintendent Guy Mannion - Retires
 PC Roz Clarke - Resigns from the force after finding the job too difficult

Episodes
{| class="wikitable plainrowheaders" style="width:100%; margin:auto; background:#FFFFFF;"
|-style="color:#8D7"
! style="background-color:#116600;" width="20"|#
! style="background-color:#116600;" width="150"|Title
! style="background-color:#116600;" width="230"|Episode notes
! style="background-color:#116600;" width="140"|Directed by
! style="background-color:#116600;" width="150"|Written by
! style="background-color:#116600;" width="100"|Original air date

|}

2001 British television seasons
The Bill series